Truman Bradley or Truman Mauwee (c. 1826–1900) was a Schaghticoke Native American who lived in the village of Nichols in Trumbull, Connecticut.

He was a descendant of Gideon Mauwee, the first Schaghticoke Sachem. Bradley moved to Nichols in 1840 and was a contemporary with William Sherman, Chief of the Golden Hill Paugussett Indian Nation, who lived in the village of Nichols Farms at the Golden Hill Reservation in the mid-19th century. 

Bradley married Julia M. Kilson in March 1846, and together they had three daughters. The Bradleys are buried in the Nichols Farm's Burial Ground. Bradley is believed to have lived in the Ephraim Hawley House as early as 1840, working the farm for the widow Sarah Hawley-Nichols after her second husband Isaac Nichols died. Bradley purchased the house in 1881 from Charles Fairchild. At the time, the property was called the Sarah Hawley homestead. Bradley renovated the house in the colonial revival architectural style in 1881, turning it into a two family home, before selling it to Clarissa Curtiss in 1882.

Notes

See also
Ephraim Hawley House
Schaghticoke tribe
Trudie Lamb-Richmond
History of Trumbull, Connecticut

References
Reverend Samuel Orcutt, History of the Old Town of Stratford, Connecticut, Fairfield Historical Society, 1886
Charles Brilvitch, A History of Connecticut's Golden Hill Paugussett Tribe, The History Press, 2007

External links
Schaghticoke Tribal Nation
Department of Interior 2002
The USGenWeb Project, Fairfield County

People from Trumbull, Connecticut
19th-century Native Americans
Trumbull, Connecticut
1820s births
Year of birth uncertain
1900 deaths
Schaghticoke tribe